Carvacrol, or cymophenol, C6H3(CH3)(OH)C3H7, is a monoterpenoid phenol. It has a characteristic pungent, warm odor of oregano.

Natural occurrence 
Carvacrol is present in the essential oil of Origanum vulgare (oregano), oil of thyme, oil obtained from pepperwort, and wild bergamot. The essential oil of thyme subspecies contains between 5% and 75% of carvacrol, while Satureja (savory) subspecies have a content between 1% and 45%. Origanum majorana (marjoram) and Dittany of Crete are rich in carvacrol, 50% and 60–80% respectively.

It is also found in tequila and Lippia graveolens (Mexican oregano) in the verbena family.

Sources 
 Monarda didyma
 Nigella sativa
 Origanum compactum
 Origanum dictamnus
 Origanum microphyllum
 Origanum onites
 Origanum scabrum
 Origanum syriacum
 Origanum vulgare
 Plectranthus amboinicus
 Thymus glandulosus
 Lavandula multifida
 Origanum minutiflorum
 Satureja thymbra

Synthesis and derivatives 
Carvacrol may be synthetically prepared by a number of routes. The fusion of cymol sulfonic acid with caustic potash results in desulfonation. By the action of nitrous acid on 1-methyl-2-amino-4-propyl benzene, one effects diazotization. Prolonged heating of camphor and iodine or carvone with glacial phosphoric acid have also been demonstrated. The dehydrogenation of carvone with a palladium-carbon catalyst has been established. 

It has also been prepared by transalkylation of isopropylated cresols.

It is extracted from Origanum oil by means of a 50% potash solution. It is a thick oil that sets at 20 °C to a mass of crystals of melting point 0 °C, and boiling point 236–237 °C. Oxidation with ferric chloride converts it into dicarvacrol, whilst phosphorus pentachloride transforms it into chlorcymol.

Antimicrobial effects 
In vitro, carvacrol has antimicrobial activity against 25 different phytopathogenic bacteria and strains including: Cladosporium herbarum, Penicillium glabrum, Pseudomonas syringae, and fungi such as Fusarium verticillioides/F. moniliforme, Rhizoctonia solani/R. solani, Sclerotinia sclerotiorum, and Phytophthora capsici.

Compendial status 
 British Pharmacopoeia

See also 
 Thymol
 Essential oil

Notes and references

Natural phenols
Monoterpenes
Alkylphenols
Isopropyl compounds